Magyar Posta Zrt. (Hungarian for Hungarian Post JSC) or Hungarian Post is the postal administration of Hungary. Besides normal mail delivery, Magyar Posta also offers logistics, banking, and marketing services.

History
The origin of the Magyar Posta was the independent national public institution called Magyar Királyi Posta established in 1867 as part of the Austro-Hungarian Compromise of 1867.  While at first it used the stamps of the Austrian Empire, in 1871 it issued its own stamps.
The Magyar Királyi Posta was the first to experiment with the motorization of the postal conveyances, beginning in 1897. In 1900, they adopted János Csonka's motorized tricycle, which continued in use by the postal service until the 1920s.

In 1918, they briefly dropped the Királyi from their name during the First Hungarian Republic (1918-1920), and restored it under the regency beginning in 1920.  In 1945 under the provisional government it again became just Magyar Posta.

The Magyar Posta became an independent agency in 1983. On January 1, 1990, during the change of regime, the unified Magyar Posta was divided into three organizations. The telephone service was spun off into the Hungarian Telecommunications Company, and broadcasting became the Hungarian Broadcasting Company.  Magyar Posta became a separate and independent corporation under the Minister of Transport. In 1994, it was privatized into a joint-stock corporation with some government ownership. In 2006, it became a private limited liability company.

See also
Postage stamps and postal history of Hungary

References

External links
 Hungarian Post Office

Logistics companies of Hungary
Companies based in Budapest
Transport companies established in 1867
Hung
Communications in Hungary
Postal system of Hungary
Philately of Hungary
Government-owned companies of Hungary
Hungarian brands